The following is a list of ecoregions in Zimbabwe, according to the Worldwide Fund for Nature (WWF).

Terrestrial ecoregions
by major habitat type

Tropical and subtropical grasslands, savannas, and shrublands

 Kalahari Acacia-Baikiaea woodlands
 Southern Africa bushveld
 Southern miombo woodlands
 Zambezian Baikiaea woodlands
 Zambezian and mopane woodlands

Montane grasslands and shrublands

 Eastern Zimbabwe montane forest-grassland mosaic

Freshwater ecoregions
by bioregion

Zambezi 
 Zambezian Lowveld
 Zambezi
 Mulanje
 Eastern Zimbabwe Highlands
 Zambezian (Plateau) Highveld
 Middle Zambezi Luangwa

References
 Burgess, Neil, Jennifer D’Amico Hales, Emma Underwood (2004). Terrestrial Ecoregions of Africa and Madagascar: A Conservation Assessment. Island Press, Washington DC.
 Thieme, Michelle L. (2005). Freshwater Ecoregions of Africa and Madagascar: A Conservation Assessment. Island Press, Washington DC.

 
Zimbabwe
Ecoregions